Norrköping Airport  is an airport situated around  from the city center of Norrköping, Sweden. In 2019, it saw 103,298 passengers.

History
The airport was founded in 1934. It had the highest number of passengers in the 1980s, and has declined since. The connection to Stockholm was closed down in 2001 because of improvements in highway connections to Stockholm, and train connection to Arlanda (so passengers planning to fly from Arlanda could use the train instead of an expensive air connection).

Airlines and destinations

As of mid-February 2019, flybmi was the only airline offering regularly scheduled flight services to and from the airport; this service ended on February 16, 2019, when flybmi ceased all of its operations after it filed for administration. Norrköping Airport now only offers seasonal and seasonal charter flights. There are also cargo flights.

Statistics

See also
List of the largest airports in the Nordic countries

References

External links

 Norrköping airport website

Airports in Sweden
Buildings and structures in Norrköping
1934 establishments in Sweden
Airports established in 1934
International airports in Sweden